Douar Nevez is a folk rock album by Dan Ar Bras. It was originally released as an LP in 1977 by Hexagone (WEA France), catalogue number 883 009. The album was produced by Hugues De Courson.

This was Ar Bras' first recording after his touring stint with Fairport Convention. He was assisted on bass by Fairport's Dave Pegg.

Track listing 
All tracks composed by Dan Ar Bras.
Intro
Retour De Guerre
Naissance De Dahud
Mort Et Immersion De Malguen / Fin Du Voyage
Naissance De La Ville
Morvac'h (Cheval de La Mer)
Orgies Nocturnes
L'Ennui Du Roi
Les Forces Du Mal
L'Appel Du Sage
Submersion De La Ville
Douar Nevez (Terre Nouvelle)

Releases
 CD	Douar Nevez Sony BMG	 2006

Personnel 
Dan Ar Bras - electric and acoustic guitars
Patrig Molard - flute, bagpipes
Benoît Widemann - keyboards
Dave Pegg - bass
Michel Santangeli - drums
Marc Chantereau - percussion

1977 albums
Dan Ar Braz albums